Raúl Papaleo Pérez (born October 11, 1971 in San Juan, Puerto Rico) is considered by many islanders to be the greatest beach volleyball player in Puerto Rico. He won the bronze medal in the men's beach team competition at the 2003 Pan American Games in Santo Domingo, Dominican Republic, partnering Ramón Hernández.

Early years
Born in the Ocean Park section of San Juan, to a middle-class family, Papaleo is one of three siblings. Papaleo received his primary and secondary education in Colegio San Jose de Caguas and also played others sports like baseball, basketball and motorcross. His father is a coach for an elementary school, where he started playing the sport. Papaleo, attended Indiana University-Purdue University at Fort Wayne after graduating from high school and studied Human Resources.  In the meantime, he continued playing volleyball.

Puerto Rican National Team
In 1990, Papaleo qualified to play for the Puerto Rican National Team which is governed by the Puerto Rican Olympic Committee.  He played Indoor Volleyball and in 1991 he made a Final Four appearance.  In 1992, Papaleo qualified for the NCAA All-American second team.  That year, he also made the Volleyball Monthly All-American third team and helped his team to another Final Four appearance.  In 1995, Papaleo won the AVP qualifier in Denver, Colorado in Beach Volleyball.  That same year, he played in the Pre-Olympic qualifier for Puerto Rico.  In 1996 he was named AVP Rookie of the Year.

International competitions
In the Pan-American Games held in the Dominican Republic in August 2003, Raúl Papaleo and his teammate, Ramon Hernandez, won the bronze Medal by defeating the U.S. team, represented by David Fischer and Brad Torsone,  by 21-17 and 21–14 in 43 minutes. Raúl Papaleo and Ramon Hernandez represented Puerto Rico in the 2004 Olympics which were held in Athens, Greece. This was the first time in the history of Puerto Rico that the island was represented with a Beach Volleyball Team in an Olympic competition.

Papaleo's total domestic earnings from 1994 to 2003 were $74,560 and his total international earnings from 1996 to 2004 have been $34,626 for a grand total of $109,185 monies earned.

Later years
When not playing internationally, Papaleo plays locally for the "Caribes de San Sebastián" in the "Liga Superior de Voleibol Masculino" (Superior League of Masculine Volleyball) of Puerto Rico.  In 1999, he was awarded the "Gentleman of the Year Award" from the league. The basketball court, where volleyball is also played, of the José Gautier Benítez high school of Caguas is named after Raúl Papaleo.

He played the 2006 NORCECA Men's Beach Volleyball Continental Championship along with Joseph Gil. They finished in second place, after Gil suffered several injuries playing the semifinals.

At the NORCECA Beach Volleyball Circuit 2008, he completed an all Puerto Rican podium at the Carolina Beach Volleyball Tournament. He played with Ramón Hernández On July 11, 2008, Papaleo was contracted by the Guaynabo Mets of Liga de Voleibol Superior Masculino (The Superior Masculine Volleyball League).

See also

 List of Puerto Ricans
 Sports in Puerto Rico

References

External links
 U.S. Volleyball News
 
 
 
 

1971 births
Living people
Puerto Rican men's beach volleyball players
Beach volleyball players at the 2004 Summer Olympics
Olympic beach volleyball players of Puerto Rico
Beach volleyball players at the 2003 Pan American Games
Sportspeople from San Juan, Puerto Rico
Pan American Games bronze medalists for Puerto Rico
Pan American Games medalists in volleyball
Central American and Caribbean Games gold medalists for Puerto Rico
Competitors at the 2002 Central American and Caribbean Games
Central American and Caribbean Games medalists in beach volleyball
Medalists at the 2003 Pan American Games
21st-century Puerto Rican people